Eusphyrus is a genus of fungus weevils in the family Anthribidae. There are at least 30 described species in Eusphyrus.

Species
These 37 species belong to the genus Eusphyrus:

 Eusphyrus analis Jordan, 1906 c
 Eusphyrus arizonensis Schaeffer, 1906 i c
 Eusphyrus bicolor Jordan, 1906 c
 Eusphyrus blanchardi Blackwelder, c
 Eusphyrus brunneus Lacordaire, 1866 c
 Eusphyrus circulus Jordan, 1906 c
 Eusphyrus dilutus Jordan, 1906 c
 Eusphyrus directus Wolfrum, 1929 c
 Eusphyrus eusphyroides (Schaeffer, 1906) i b
 Eusphyrus fragilis Jordan, 1906 c
 Eusphyrus fuscipennis Wolfrum, 1953 c
 Eusphyrus hamatus Jordan, 1904 c
 Eusphyrus insignis Jordan, 1906 c
 Eusphyrus irpex Jordan, 1906 c
 Eusphyrus laetus Suffr., 1870 c
 Eusphyrus laevicollis Jordan, 1906 c
 Eusphyrus lateralis Jordan, 1904 c
 Eusphyrus lioderus Jordan, 1906 c
 Eusphyrus minax Jordan, 1906 c
 Eusphyrus mucronatus Jordan, 1906 c
 Eusphyrus nubilus Jordan, 1904 c
 Eusphyrus parvulus Wolfrum, 1953 c
 Eusphyrus punctatus Wolfrum, 1959 c
 Eusphyrus quercus (Schaeffer, 1906) i
 Eusphyrus rectus Schaeffer, 1906 i c b
 Eusphyrus ros Jordan, 1906 c
 Eusphyrus rugicollis Jordan, 1906 c
 Eusphyrus schwarzi Pierce, 1930 i c
 Eusphyrus scutellaris Jordan, 1906 c
 Eusphyrus scutosus Jordan, 1906 c
 Eusphyrus simplex Jordan, 1906 c
 Eusphyrus tenuis Jordan, 1906 c
 Eusphyrus tonsor Jordan, 1906 c
 Eusphyrus unicolor Jordan, 1906 c
 Eusphyrus vestitus Jordan, 1906 c
 Eusphyrus walshi LeConte, 1876 i b
 Eusphyrus walshii LeConte, J.L., 1876 c g

Data sources: i = ITIS, c = Catalogue of Life, g = GBIF, b = Bugguide.net

References

Further reading

 
 
 
 
 
 
 

Anthribidae
Articles created by Qbugbot